Spheniscidite is a phosphate mineral. It is the ammonium analogue of leucophosphite.

See also
 Sphenisciformes (penguins), the mineral has been named after this clade
 Elephant Island, type locality

References

Phosphate minerals